Tachina nupta is a species of fly in the genus Tachina of the family Tachinidae that can be found in such European countries as Austria, Bulgaria, Czech Republic, France, Germany, Hungary, Italy, Moldova, Romania, Switzerland, Ukraine, Yugoslavia, and Sicily island. They can also be found in Japan, Mongolia, and in Chinese capital, Beijing.

Larvae
The species larvae transfers parasites into various caterpillars of  moths and butterflies.

References

Insects described in 1859
Diptera of Asia
Diptera of Europe
nupta
Taxa named by Camillo Rondani